Agustin Gómez may refer to:

 Agustín Gómez (footballer, born 1922), Spanish football left-back
 Agustín Gómez (footballer, born 1983), Argentine football goalkeeper
 Agustin Gómez (footballer, born 1996), Argentine football defender